William Ferguson Slemons (March 15, 1830 – December 10, 1918) was a U.S. Representative from Arkansas.

Biography
Born in Dresden, Tennessee, Slemons attended Bethel College.
He moved to Arkansas in 1852.
He studied law, including at Cumberland University.
He was admitted to the bar in 1855 and practiced in Monticello, Drew County.
He served as member of the Arkansas State convention in 1861.
He entered the Confederate States Army in July 1861 and served as colonel of the 2nd Arkansas Cavalry in Price's Cavalry during the Civil War. In the Fall of 1864, while fighting in Kansas, Slemons had his horse shot out from under him, and he and a large part of his regiment were captured. For the remainder of the war, he was held captive by Union forces.
He resumed the practice of law.
He served as district attorney 1866-1868.

Slemons was elected as a Democrat to the Forty-fourth, Forty-fifth, and Forty-sixth Congresses (March 4, 1875 – March 3, 1881).
He was not a candidate for renomination in 1880.
He resumed the practice of his profession in Monticello, Arkansas.
County and probate judge of Drew County 1903-1907.
He was in the Justice of the Peace 1908-1918.
He died in Monticello, Arkansas, December 10, 1918 and was interred in Union Ridge Cemetery, near Monticello, Arkansas.

References

Sources
 Retrieved on 2008-02-14

1830 births
1918 deaths
Democratic Party members of the United States House of Representatives from Arkansas
Arkansas lawyers
County judges in Arkansas
District attorneys in Arkansas
Arkansas state court judges
Confederate States Army officers
People from Dresden, Tennessee
People of Arkansas in the American Civil War
Bethel University (Tennessee) alumni
19th-century American politicians
American Civil War prisoners of war
19th-century American judges
19th-century American lawyers